Phrynobatrachus liberiensis is a species of frog in the family Petropedetidae. It is found in Côte d'Ivoire, Ghana, Guinea, Liberia, and Sierra Leone.

Its natural habitats are subtropical or tropical moist lowland forest, subtropical or tropical moist montane forest, rivers, and swampland. It is threatened by habitat loss.

References

liberiensis
Amphibians described in 1927
Frogs of Africa
Taxonomy articles created by Polbot